Apartment 1303 3D is a 2012 supernatural horror film directed by Michael Taverna. The US-Canadian co-production is an English-language remake of the 2007 Japanese film Apartment 1303, which in turn is an adaptation of the novel Apartment 1303 by Japanese author Kei Ôishi. The film stars Mischa Barton, Rebecca De Mornay and Julianne Michelle. The film officially went into production in Montreal in early November 2011. The film was released theatrically in Russia on December 6, 2012. In the United States, the film was released on the VOD platform on June 17, 2013, followed by a theatrical release on July 25, 2013.

Plot
Following a family dispute, Janet Slate moves out of the home she shares with her older sister, Lara and their single mother, Maddie. She moves into apartment 1303 on the thirteenth floor of a downtown Detroit apartment building. A 9-year-old neighbor, Emily, explains to Janet that a previous occupant of her new apartment killed herself. Strange things begin to occur in the apartment and when Janet appears bruised at work, she rebuffs her coworkers’ concerns that her boyfriend, Mark Taylor, is abusing her and blames the marks on sleepwalking.

Janet is shaken by the strange events that are happening preferring to stay late at the office rather than return to apartment 1303. She calls her sister, Lara, to ask if she can return home but Lara informs her this would be a bad idea as their mother is having another "drunk psycho rant". Janet suggests going to a hotel but this is quickly dismissed as Lara is not able to pay for it. Janet then calls Mark who is back in town, who agrees to check in on her. Later that night, Janet is awoken by strange supernatural elements in the apartment but unfortunately Mark is no longer around. An invisible ghost possesses Janet leading to her own depression and suicide. Her sister, Lara, later arrives to gather the possessed Janet's belongings and begins to experience the same terrors.

A detective that was on the case talks to Lara, who believes Janet was murdered. The detective agrees since he's been investigating mysterious suicides with other tenants. Lara discovers the name of the first tenant from 20 years back, Jennifer Logan. The detective tells Lara the sad story of what happened to Jennifer. At the age of 12, she moved into apartment 1303 with her mother, Mary, a respectable school teacher and recently divorced. For the first few years in the apartment, they lived in peace and Mary was a loving mother to Jennifer.

However, the peace was shattered when Mary lost her job as a teacher during a dispute with a parent in a parent-teacher conference. She found work as a prostitute to pay for the apartment, became an alcoholic and brutally abused Jennifer. This leads to Jennifer murdering Mary and burying her in a built in closet. Soon neighbors complained about the smell of the apartment, causing the police and the health department to investigate. By the time they got to the apartment to confront Jennifer, she had already committed suicide by jumping out the window and the police found the decomposed body of Mary. In the years that followed, more tenants were thought to have committed suicide with Janet being the most recent one.

While taking a bath, Lara gets a cryptic warning from Janet to leave the apartment and never come back. However, another dispute with Maddie has Lara moving into the same apartment and ignoring Janet's warning. Jennifer soon arrives and kills Mark by throwing him out the window. Horrified, Lara tries to escape the apartment complex to avoid Jennifer trying to kill her and stay away from the complex for good. However, she catches Emily and the landlord, O'Neill in front of her. He finally reveals the truth to Lara about his daughter, Emily's fate. A year after apartment 1303 was cleaned, they moved in and became Jennifer's first victims.

Lara learns that O'Neill, Emily along with Janet and the previous victims had been trying to warn others to never move into apartment 1303 to no avail. When Jennifer starts to close in on her, Lara grabs a knife to try to defend herself. As Maddie tries to talk some sense to Lara, Jennifer pushes her towards the knife and kills her. Just before she can finish the job to kill Lara, the police arrive and Jennifer disappears. Lara is arrested for both Maddie and Mark's murder and is taken away to be booked. As the sun rises, Jennifer is last seen sitting on the same spot where she committed suicide: an unseen warning of what happens when anyone moves into apartment 1303.

Cast

Production
The Swedish director Daniel Fridell had originally been set to direct the project but was later replaced by Michael Taverna.

A specialised crew of 3D experts from Hong Kong were hired for the film.

Reception

Box office 
The film grossed $3,377,891 worldwide against a $5 million budget.

Critical response 
Justin Chang of Variety called the film an "inept and derivative tale" that is not unintentionally funny enough to be "so bad it's good". Frank Scheck of The Hollywood Reporter wrote, "This non-starter horror film, inexplicably released in 3D, won't haunt theaters for very long." Shawn Macomber of Fangoria rated it 1/4 stars and wrote, "The movie exhibits the germ of something that could potentially be a lot of fun on Saturday night basic cable. Problem is, its higher aspirations are a gauntlet thrown in the way of a deviously barmy romp." Gareth Jones of Dread Central rated it 0.5/5 stars and wrote, "Bereft of interesting characters, dialogue, acting ability, scares, visual aplomb or much of anything else, Apartment 1303 is occasionally good for a derogatory laugh, or simply to witness what must be the middle of one serious mire in Rebecca de Mornay's career." Andrew Pollard of Starburst rated it 3/10 stars and wrote that there is "no emotion, no care, no feeling and no reason to watch."

References

External links
 
 
 

2012 films
2012 3D films
2012 horror films
American independent films
English-language Canadian films
Canadian supernatural horror films
Films about suicide
American ghost films
American haunted house films
Horror film remakes
Films based on Japanese novels
Films set in apartment buildings
Films set in Detroit
Films shot in Montreal
American remakes of Japanese films
Films based on adaptations
2010s English-language films
2010s American films
2010s Canadian films